Fasolasuchus is an extinct genus of loricatan. Fossils have been found in the Los Colorados Formation of the Ischigualasto-Villa Unión Basin in northwestern Argentina that date back to the Norian stage of the Late Triassic, making it one of the last rauisuchians to have existed before the order became extinct at the end of the Triassic.

Description 
 

This would make Fasolasuchus the largest terrestrial predator to have ever existed save for large theropods. Like Saurosuchus, it had only a single row of caudal osteoderms, unusual among rauisuchians. It also had a hyposphene-hypantrum articulation that gave the vertebral column extra rigidity. This feature is also seen in several other rauisuchians such as Postosuchus as well as saurischian dinosaurs.

Phylogeny 
Cladogram after the analysis of Nesbitt (2011):

References

External links 
 Fasolasuchus in the Paleobiology Database
 

Paracrocodylomorphs
Norian life
Late Triassic reptiles of South America
Triassic Argentina
Fossils of Argentina
Los Colorados Formation
Fossil taxa described in 1981
Taxa named by José Bonaparte
Prehistoric pseudosuchian genera